The National Basketball Association's Executive of the Year Award is an annual award given since the 1972–73 NBA season, to the league's best general manager, president of basketball/business operations, or another high-ranking executive. Before 2009, the Executive of the Year was presented annually by Sporting News, but was officially recognized by the NBA. Since 2009, the award has been awarded by the NBA. Voting is conducted by executives from the league's 30 teams. The person with the most votes wins the award.

Since its inception, the award has been given to 28 different general managers. Jerry Colangelo, the first general manager for the Phoenix Suns, is the only person to win the award four times. Bob Bass, R. C. Buford, Wayne Embry, Bob Ferry, Stan Kasten, Jerry Krause, Bob Myers, Geoff Petrie, Jerry West, as well as Jerry Colangelo's son Bryan Colangelo have all won the award twice. All of the award winners were born in the United States until then–Denver Nuggets general manager Masai Ujiri, who was born in England, won the award in 2013. Larry Bird, Frank Layden and Pat Riley join Red Auerbach as the only recipients to have also received NBA Coach of the Year. Bird is also the only winner to receive the NBA Most Valuable Player in addition to either of the Coach or Executive of the Year awards.

Winners

Multi-time winners

Teams

See also

Sports Illustrated Best GM of the Decade (NBA) (2009)
Sports Illustrated Top 10 GMs of the Decade (all sports)
 List of National Basketball Association general managers
 List of National Basketball Association team presidents

Notes

References
General

Specific

Executive of the Year
National Basketball Association lists